Hendrikje Fitz (15 September 1961 – 7 April 2016) was a German actress best known for her role as Pia Heilmann on the ARD soap opera In aller Freundschaft.

Films
 1989: Reise hinter den Spiegel
 1990: Das Haus am Watt
 1998: Die Cleveren (television series, ep. "Du stirbst, wie ich es will")
 1998–2016: In aller Freundschaft (television series)
 2000: Fieber – Ärzte für das Leben (television series, ep. "Wettlauf mit dem Tod")
 2000: Tatort: Tödliches Verlangen (television)
 2001: Alphateam – Die Lebensretter im OP (television series, ep. "Viel Rauch um Nichts")
 2001: Ist gut jetzt
 2002: Wolffs Revier (television series)
 2002: Dr. Sommerfeld – Neues vom Bülowbogen (television series, ep. "Hektik, Panik, Erotik")
 2002: Ripley's Game
 2004: Männer im gefährlichen Alter
 2011: 
 2014: Stuttgart Homicide (television series, ep. "Bunker")
 2015: Das perfekte Promi-Dinner (television show)
 2015: Los Veganeros

Death
Hendrikje Fitz died in 2016 from cancer, aged 55.

References

External links

Abendzeitung München: In aller Freundschaft Star an Krebs gestorben; accessed 12 August 2016 (in German)

1961 births
2016 deaths
20th-century German actresses
21st-century German actresses
Deaths from cancer in Germany
German film actresses
German television actresses
Actors from Frankfurt
Burials at the Waldfriedhof Zehlendorf